Direct election is a system of choosing political officeholders in which the voters directly cast ballots for the persons or political party that they desire to see elected.

For the most part, government by the people means government by election where the people are choosing candidates and parties to represent them in office. Yet there are many different ways to structure elections including both direct and indirect elections. The method by which the winner or winners of a direct election are chosen depends upon the electoral system used.

The most commonly used direct election systems are the plurality system and the two-round system for single-winner elections, such as a presidential election, and party-list proportional representation for the election of a legislature.

By contrast, in an indirect election, the voters elect a body which in turn elects the officeholder in question.

History of direct presidential elections 
The idea that heads of state be elected directly by the people progressed slowly throughout the eighteenth and nineteenth centuries. This differs from parliamentary systems where executives derive power from the legislative body.

United States 
The conceptual origins of direct presidential elections stem from the U.S. Constitution (1787) through the Electoral College. The Framers intended for the a small group of electors, through methods determined by each state, to elect the president. Thus in practice this represents a form of indirect election.

Europe 
The first major European country to use direct elections was France (1848). However, if no candidate received a majority of the vote the National Assembly chose the winner from the top five candidates. Germany (1919) was the first European country to use direct election of a president without intervention by the legislature. Currently, Europe has a mix of parliamentary republics, presidential republics, where the president is elected directly by the people, and semi-presidential republics, which have a president elected directly and a prime minister in charge of the parliament.

Colonial Legacies 
A major debate exists regarding colonial legacies and the promotion of democracy around the world. In terms of direct elections, former British colonies are less likely to hold direct elections for heads of state. Additionally no monarchies have direct elections for head of state since by definition the head of state is unelected.

Asia 
The overwhelming majority of democracies in Asia are parliamentary, rather than presidential systems. Based on constitutional design, the Philippines is the only head of state elected by popular vote.  Although classified as a semi-presidential system, South Korea in political reality has a strong presidential system as well based on changes in 1987 to its constitution.

Latin America 
Bolstered by opposition groups, institutional and constitutional change in the 1980s and 1990s led to direct elections of presidents in many South American countries.These changes created centralized power in presidential positions, often blurring the line of separation of powers and making them powerful decision-makers over the legislature and cabinet.

Africa 
Many African nations have moved from parliamentary to presidential systems. Regardless of constitutional structures, presidents often have immense power over other political decision-making bodies. Given this power, much of the political violence around elections stems from the elections of presidents. Additionally, recent coups and conflict have postponed direct presidential elections in several African countries.

Advantages and disadvantages of directly electing the head of state 
A common political debate, particularly as countries consider governmental reforms, is whether or not direct elections of heads of state strengthen democratic practices among citizens. Selection mechanisms for heads of state can lead to varying outcomes in terms of voter interest, turnout, and overall engagement. For example, some scholars argue that direct elections will mobilize voters and increase their trust in the political process, particularly in emerging democracies. Others note that frequent direct elections may decrease turnout due to voter fatigue and apathy.

Direct elections in legislatures and parliaments

Legislatures 

 The European Parliament has been directly elected every five years since 1979. Member states determine how to elect their representatives, but, among other requirements, they must be directly elected.
 The United States House of Representatives has been directly elected using first-past-the-post voting since its inception in 1789.
 The United States Senate begin directly electing senators in 1914—after the passage and ratification of the Seventeenth Amendment to the United States Constitution.

See also
Direct election republican model (Australia)
Electoral college

References

Elections by type
Direct democracy